Giscome Canyon is a canyon on the Fraser River in the northern Central Interior of British Columbia, Canada, upstream from the city of Prince George near Tay Creek and at the southern end of the route known as the Giscome Portage.

See also
 Fraser Canyon
 Grand Canyon of the Fraser

References
 

Canyons and gorges of British Columbia
Northern Interior of British Columbia
Fraser River